Agios Dimitrios (Greek: Άγιος Δημήτριος meaning Saint Demetrius) is a village and a community in the municipal unit of Amaliada, northern Elis, Peloponnese, Greece. It is situated on the left bank of the river Pineios, 3 km west of the Pineios reservoir. It is 3 km west of Kentro, 3 km northeast of Archaia Ilida (ancient Elis), 12 km east of Andravida and 12 km northeast of Amaliada. The community Agios Dimitrios includes the village Kolokythas.

Historical population

See also
List of settlements in Elis

References

Populated places in Elis